Shoreline Mafia was an American hip hop group based in Los Angeles and currently signed to Atlantic Records. The group released their first full-length mixtape, ShoreLineDoThatShit, in November 2017. That album was re-released by Atlantic in May 2018. In August 2018, they also released an EP titled Party Pack through Atlantic. In September 2019, they released Party Pack Vol. 2 through Atlantic. In July 2020, they released their debut album, Mafia Bidness. In early April 2020, the group's founding member "Fenix Flexin" announced his departure from the group.

History
Shoreline Mafia was composed of four members: OhGeesy (real name: Alejandro Coranza), Rob Vicious (Robert Maggee), Fenix Flexin (Fenix Rypinski) and Master Kato (Malik Carson). Ohgeesy and Fenix met in 2012 while doing graffiti in Los Angeles. The pair began making music soon after, and, sometime later, Rob Vicious and Master Kato joined them. Although they produced music for several years, they did not become a rap group until 2016. They chose the name Shoreline Mafia at some point after their formation.

In November 2017, they independently released their first full-length mixtape, ShoreLineDoThatShit. The album featured songs such as "Nun Major," "Musty," and "Bottle Service". Most of the songs on the album were produced by Ron-Ron including "Musty" and "Bottle Service", the beats for which the group was not initially authorized to use. Despite this, the two parties eventually formed a partnership that continues to exist. In December of that year, the group performed at the Rolling Loud Festival in San Bernardino, California. In the spring of 2018, the group headlined their "Only The Xclusives" (OTX) tour.

In May 2018, Atlantic Records announced that it had signed Shoreline Mafia. At that time, the label also re-released ShoreLineDoThatShit and debuted a new music video for the song "Musty". Later that month, the group embarked on the "Still OTX" tour, which included stops at the Rolling Loud Festival in Miami and, later, at the Billboard Hot 100 Music Festival in New York. In June 2018, Shoreline Mafia was featured on songs on the Ron-Ron and Friends compilation mixtape alongside 03 Greedo, Drakeo the Ruler, and others.

The following month, Rob Vicious released a solo mixtape titled Traplantic. The songs on the album also featured members of Shoreline Mafia, including "Bands" which had verses from everyone. In August 2018, the group released a 4-track EP called Party Pack via Atlantic Records. In the fall of 2018, the band went on their "Only The Xclusives" tour throughout the United States. The group also performed at the Los Angeles iteration of the Rolling Loud Festival in December 2018. In early April 2020, Fenix Flexin announced that he would be leaving Shoreline Mafia after the release of their new album, Mafia Bidness. The album followed on July 31, 2020.

Discography

Studio albums

Mixtapes

EPs

Singles

References

External links
 Official website

Atlantic Records artists
Hip hop groups from California
Musical groups from Los Angeles
Musical groups established in 2016
Rappers from Los Angeles
2016 establishments in California